Óscar del Tránsito González Figueroa (24 August 1894 – 10 June 1959), known as Colo-Colo González, was a Chilean footballer who played as a midfielder.

International career
He made twelve appearances for Chile, playing at three South American Championships: 1919, 1922 and 1926.

Honours
Colo-Colo
Liga Central de Football de Santiago (2): 1928, 1929
División de Honor de la Asociación de Football de Santiago (1): 1930

References

External links

Óscar González at playmakerstats.com (English version of ceroacero.es)
Óscar González at Partidos de la Roja (in Spanish)

1894 births
1959 deaths
People from Coquimbo
Chilean footballers
Chile international footballers
Club de Deportes Green Cross footballers
Colo-Colo footballers
Santiago Morning footballers
Chilean Primera División players
Place of birth missing
Association football midfielders